Jasper County Courthouse may refer to:

 Jasper County Courthouse (Georgia), Monticello, Georgia
 Jasper County Courthouse (Illinois), Newton, Illinois
 Jasper County Courthouse (Indiana), Rensselaer, Indiana
 Jasper County Courthouse (Iowa), Newton, Iowa
 Jasper County Courthouse (Missouri), Carthage, Missouri
 Jasper County Courthouse (South Carolina), Ridgeland, South Carolina
 Jasper County Courthouse (Texas), Jasper, Texas